Zeina Daccache is a Lebanese actress and director.

Filmography

As a director
12 Angry Lebanese: The Documentary released in 2009.
Scheherazade's Diary released on December 9, 2013.
Yanoosak released on October 21, 2010.

References

External links 
 Profile on LAU website: http://whoisshe.lau.edu.lb/expert-profile/zeina-daccache
 

Lebanese film actresses
Living people
Year of birth missing (living people)